The Sofia Trophy is an international figure skating competition held yearly in Sofia, Bulgaria. Medals may be awarded in men's and ladies' singles on the senior, junior, and novice levels. It is part of the European Criterium.

Senior medalists

Men

Ladies

Junior medalists

Men

Ladies

Advanced novice medalists

Men

Ladies

References

External links 
 Sofia Trophy

International figure skating competitions hosted by Bulgaria